Diomus terminatus is a species of lady beetle in the family Coccinellidae. It is found in throughout eastern North America. It is brown and oval-shaped, with a reddish tinge at the back portion of its elytra, and about 1.5 to 2 mm. It is covered in gold-colored setae, giving it a slightly hairy appearance. Its prey likely includes aphids, scale, and mealybugs.

References

Further reading

External links

 

Coccinellidae
Articles created by Qbugbot
Beetles described in 1835